Wiktor Chabel (born 23 November 1985) is a Polish rower. He competed in the men's quadruple sculls event at the 2016 Summer Olympics. In October 2017 he married a Polish rower Monika Ciaciuch.

References

External links

1985 births
Living people
Polish male rowers
Olympic rowers of Poland
Rowers at the 2016 Summer Olympics
Rowers at the 2020 Summer Olympics
People from Sandomierz
Sportspeople from Świętokrzyskie Voivodeship
World Rowing Championships medalists for Poland
European Rowing Championships medalists